The 1946 Chattanooga Moccasins football team was an American football team that represented the University of Chattanooga (now known as the University of Tennessee at Chattanooga) as an independent during the 1946 college football season. In its 16th year under head coach Scrappy Moore, the team compiled a 5–5 record.

The Moccasins ranked 13th nationally in total offense with an average of 329.9 yards per game. Back Gene "Choo Choo" Roberts ranked second in the country with 1,113 rushing yards.  Roberts was also the leading scorer among major college players with 117 points scored on 18 touchdowns and nine extra points.

Schedule

References

Chattanooga
Chattanooga Mocs football seasons
Chattanooga Moccasins football